In Good Company is an album by saxophonist Ted Brown with guitarist Jimmy Raney recorded in 1985 and released on the Dutch label, Criss Cross Jazz. The CD rerelease added five alternate takes in 1990 renaming the album Good Company and displaying Jimmy Raney's name more prominently.

Reception 

David R. Adler of AllMusic observed "In Good Company makes a nice companion piece to Warne Marsh's Back Home ... There's some good Tristano-oriented bop writing here." noting "Ted Brown and guitar legend Jimmy Raney are essentially co-leaders here, teaming with a stellar rhythm section".

Track listing 
 "Blimey" (Ted Brown) – 4:49
 "We'll Be Together Again" (Carl T. Fischer, Frankie Laine) – 5:56
 "Lost and Found" (Hod O'Brien) – 6:40
 "Sir Felix" (Jimmy Raney) – 4:37
 "Instant Blue" (O'Brien) – 7:01
 "Gee, Baby, Ain't I Good to You" (Andy Razaf, Don Redman) – 4:49
 "People Will Say We're in Love" (Richard Rodgers, Oscar Hammerstein II) – 6:13
 "Lost and Found" [alternate take] (O'Brien) – 6:24 Bonus track on CD reissue
 "We'll Be Together Again" [alternate take] (Fischer, Laine) – 6:29 Bonus track on CD reissue
 "Blimey" [alternate take] (Brown) – 5:09 Bonus track on CD reissue
 "Sir Felix" [alternate take] (Raney) – 4:35 Bonus track on CD reissue
 "People Will Say We're in Love" [alternate take] (Rogers, Hammerstein) – 6:48 Bonus track on CD reissue

Personnel 
Ted Brown – tenor saxophone
Jimmy Raney – guitar
Hod O'Brien – piano
Buster Williams – bass
Ben Riley – drums

References 

Ted Brown (saxophonist) albums
Jimmy Raney albums
1985 albums
Criss Cross Jazz albums
Albums recorded at Van Gelder Studio